Laugh Break was a Comedy radio station on Sirius Satellite Radio channel 105.

What they play: Lewis Black, Jerry Seinfeld, Robin Williams, Dane Cook, George Carlin, D.L. Hughley, Bob Saget, Jon Stewart, Demetri Martin, Frank Caliendo, Denis Leary, Cheech and Chong, John Oliver and Bill Maher. They also play prank calls and fake radio shows from The MJ Morning Show and audio prank calls from Crank Yankers.

With the merger of Sirius and XM, the channel was scrapped, and replaced by XM's Laugh USA on November 12, 2008.

See also
 List of Sirius Satellite Radio stations

External links
 

Defunct radio stations in the United States